The Moluccan flying fox (Pteropus chrysoproctus), also known as the Ambon flying fox, is a species of megabat in the genus Pteropus.

It is found in the low-lying forests (less than 250 m above sea level) of Seram Island (including Manusela National Park), Buru, Ambon and the nearby Maluku Islands of eastern Indonesia.

Another Pteropus species, P. argentatus, was until recently considered to be the same species as P. chrysoproctus.

The habitat has an area of less than 20,000 km2 and is decreasing due to logging. For this reason, and because of hunting by the local population, these species have been listed as Vulnerable by the IUCN.

References

Pteropus
Bats of Indonesia
Endemic fauna of Indonesia
Endemic fauna of Seram Island
Fauna of Buru
Fauna of the Lesser Sunda Islands
Fauna of the Maluku Islands

Vulnerable fauna of Asia
Vulnerable fauna of Oceania
Mammals described in 1837
Taxonomy articles created by Polbot
Taxa named by Coenraad Jacob Temminck